Welch Run is a  long 1st order tributary to Buffalo Creek in Washington County, Pennsylvania.

Course
Welch Run rises in a pond about 1.5 miles northeast of Dunsfort, Pennsylvania, in Washington County and then flows southwest to join Buffalo Creek at Dunsfort.

Watershed
Welch Run drains  of area, receives about 40.1 in/year of precipitation, has a wetness index of 288.69, and is about 88% forested.

See also
List of Pennsylvania Rivers

References

Rivers of Pennsylvania
Rivers of Washington County, Pennsylvania